Joshua Harman is an entrepreneur and activist. He is the co-founder of Selco Construction Services, as well as SPIG Industry LLC, a private Virginia-based company that installs guardrails. Harman is the whistleblower in the lawsuit against Trinity Industries Inc. He sued Trinity on behalf of the government under the qui tam provisions of the False Claims Act in 2012. In October 2014, the jury of the U.S. District Court in Marshall, Texas ruled that Trinity will pay $525 million, the largest whistleblower award won without the assistance of the US Justice Department. In June 2015, the judge awarded Harman over $199 million, or 30 percent of the final settlement of $663 million against Trinity Industries.  This verdict was reversed by the Fifth Circuit Court of Appeals who ruled that there was no evidence that the government had in any way been defrauded.

Career
In 1988, Harman and his brother, Chris, started their first business together as teenagers. The company, Selco Construction Services, began by planting vegetation along roads and highways and later expanded to installing fencing and guardrails. 
Harman and his brother founded SPIG Industry LLC in 2007. The company operates a guardrail manufacturing facility in Bristol, Virginia. During the mid-1990s until the mid-2000s, Harman bought Trinity Industries guardrail systems to install on state highways. After reporting over a year of no revenue, SPIG Industry LLC filed for bankruptcy in 2015.

Trinity Industries lawsuits
In 2012, Harman filed a lawsuit against Trinity Industries Inc. after having previously been involved in an earlier lawsuit from 2011 in which Trinity sued Harman's company SPIG Industry for patent infringement. Harman paid damages and agreed to stop the production of the early guardrail system design. After Trinity asked for the guardrails Harman's company had installed to be removed, Harman went on a two-week trip across eight states to survey accident sites involved with the ET Plus guardrail. The guardrails Harman's company installed using the earlier versions of ET-Plus guardrails had been involved in five car accidents, all of which performed in the way they were designed to. He later investigated hundreds of guardrail accidents and documented over 40 deaths and 100 injuries involving cars crashing into the redesigned ET-Plus guardrails that went into production by Trinity Industries in 2005. He alleged that Trinity had made five changes to the ET-Plus without notifying the Federal Highway Administration (FHWA) and filed the lawsuit, Joshua Harman v. Trinity Industries Inc, as a whistleblower on behalf of the federal government.

In July 2014, Judge Rodney Gilstrap declared a mistrial, referring to the case as being "replete with errors, gamesmanship [and] inappropriate conduct," as reported by the Wall Street Journal. In October 2014, the federal jury decided that Trinity defrauded the US government of $175 million by making changes to its ET-Plus guardrail system, designed to absorb the impact of a crash, without telling the Federal Highway Administration. In June 2015, the judge fined Trinity Industries $663 million for defrauding the government, of which Harman was awarded $199 million, or 30 percent, plus an additional $19 million in court fees. In December 2017 the United States Court of Appeals, Fifth Circuit reversed and rendered judgement as a matter of law for Trinity.

Personal life
Harman is married and lives in Virginia with his wife and two daughters.

References

Living people
Year of birth missing (living people)